Adama Keita may refer to:

 Adama Kéïta (footballer) (born 1990), Malian footballer
 Adama Keïta (handballer) (born 1997), French handballer